is a railway station in the city of Hanamaki, Iwate Prefecture, Japan, operated by East Japan Railway Company (JR East).

Lines
Ishidoriya Station is served by the Tōhoku Main Line, and is located 511.4 kilometers from the starting point of the line at Tokyo Station.

Station layout
The station has two opposed side platforms, connected to the station building by an overhead passage.  The station is staffed and has a Midori no Madoguchi ticket office.

Platforms

History
Ishidoriya Station opened on 15 February 1893. The station was absorbed into the JR East network upon the privatization of the Japanese National Railways (JNR) on 1 April 1987.

Passenger statistics
In fiscal 2018, the station was used by an average of 1,083 passengers daily (boarding passengers only).

Surrounding area
 Ishidoriya Post Office
 Former Ishidoriya Town Hall

See also
 List of Railway Stations in Japan

References

External links

  

Railway stations in Iwate Prefecture
Tōhoku Main Line
Railway stations in Japan opened in 1893
Hanamaki, Iwate
Stations of East Japan Railway Company